The 2017 Liga Dominicana de Fútbol season (known as the LDF Banco Popular for sponsorship reasons) is the third season of professional football in the Dominican Republic. Club Barcelona Atlético are the reigning champions, having won their first title last year.

Stadia and locations
Each team will play 18 matches in the regular season, the 4 teams with most points qualify to the playoffs. The champion will be decided in a single-legged final.

League table

Results

Championship round

Semifinals

First leg

Second leg

Club Atlético Pantoja wins 5–1 on aggregate

0–0 on aggregate. Atlántico FC won 4–2 on penalties.

Final

Awards

Top scorers

Player of the week

References

External links
FIFA
Liga Dominicana de Fútbol

Football in the Dominican Republic
Dominican Republic
2017 in Dominican Republic sport
Liga Dominicana de Fútbol seasons